Aled Williams was a footballer who played as a wing half in the Football League for Chester.

References

1933 births
Association football wing halves
2005 deaths
People from Holywell, Flintshire
Sportspeople from Flintshire
Welsh footballers
Rhyl F.C. players
Burnley F.C. players
Chester City F.C. players
Stalybridge Celtic F.C. players
English Football League players